The Pará-class destroyers were a class of ten destroyers built for the Brazilian Navy between 1908 and 1910 by Yarrow in the Scotstoun district of Glasgow, Scotland. All were named after states of Brazil. The class closely resembled the British s. All ten ships were ordered under the 1907 Naval Programme and exceeded the design speed during sea trials, the best being Parana. The class proved very maneuverable with a turning circle of 375 yards at full speed. The class served in both World War I and World War II.

Design

The Pará class was designed for a crew of 104 men, powered by double shaft, four-cylinder VTE engines with two coal-fired Yarrow boilers which produced . They were armed with two  guns, four 3-pounder guns, and two  torpedo tubes.

The ships were divided into ten watertight compartments by bulkheads from the outer bottom plating to the upper deck.

Ships

Ten ships were ordered under the 1907 Naval Program intended to modernize the navy; all built by Yarrow.

 — launched 14 July 1908, stricken 1933.
 — launched 7 December 1908, stricken 1944.
 — launched 21 November 1908, stricken 1931.
 — launched 23 January 1909, stricken 1946.
 — launched 1909, stricken 1944.
 — launched 18 May 1909, stricken 1944.
 — launched 29 July 1909, disarmed 1939.
 — launched 26 October 1909, stricken 1944.
 — launched 27 March 1910, disarmed 1933.
 — launched 25 May 1910, stricken 1944.

See also

References

Sources
 
 

Destroyer classes
 
 
 
Brazil–United Kingdom relations